The Orbital Fascia forms the periosteum of the orbit.

It is loosely connected to the bones and can be readily separated from them.

Behind, it is united with the dura mater by processes which pass through the optic foramen and superior orbital fissure, and with the sheath of the optic nerve.

In front, it is connected with the periosteum at the margin of the orbit, and sends off a process which assists in forming the orbital septum.

From it two processes are given off; one to enclose the lacrimal gland, the other to hold the pulley of the Obliquus superior in position.

Anatomy 
The orbital fascia consisting of 3 parts:

Periorbita 
Considered the periosteum of the bones forming the orbit, and is continuous with dura mater through the superior orbital fissure. It also forms the lacrimal sac.

Bulbar fascia 
also known as Tenon's capsule.
It encapsulates the eyeball, forming a narrow space, called the Episcleral space, between the fascia and eyeball. This allows for the movement of the eyeball, while providing a socket that continues posteriorly with the optic nerve and its dural covering. Anteriorly it is attached to the corneoscleral junction.

Orbital septum 
The framework that binds the orbital fat pad into the orbit, it also binds the palpebra to the bony orbit.

Other contents of the orbital cavity 
 Eyeball 
 Lacrimal gland 
 Extraocular muscles 
 Orbital adipose tissue 
 optic nerve
 Oculomotor nerve branches 
 Trochlear nerve branches 
 Ophthalmic nerve branches 
 Abducent nerve branches 
 Ciliary ganglion
 Ophthalmic artery
 Ophthalmic veins

References 

Human eye anatomy